Francisco Rodríguez García (8 March 1934 – 17 May 2022), nicknamed Rodri, was a Spanish footballer who played as a defender.

Club career
Rodri was born in Barcelona, Catalonia. After having already played his youth football at the club, Rodri signed for FC Barcelona in 1958 from neighbours CD Condal. He totalled 48 games over his first two seasons, which ended in La Liga conquest, but appeared in only nine matches in his last four.

Rodri made his debut in the top division with Condal, in a 6–0 away loss against Real Madrid on 9 September 1956, with the season ending in relegation. He left Barcelona in 1966 at the age of 32, retiring shortly after. He acted as assistant manager at his main team for six years, mostly under Rinus Michels.

International career
Rodri earned four caps for Spain in 1962, and was included in the squad for that year's FIFA World Cup. In the tournament in Chile he appeared in a 1–0 win over Mexico and a 2–1 defeat to Brazil, in an eventual group-stage exit.

Death
Rodri died on 17 May 2022, aged 88.

Honours
Barcelona
La Liga: 1958–59, 1959–60
Copa del Generalísimo: 1958–59, 1962–63
Inter-Cities Fairs Cup: 1958–60

References

External links

FC Barcelona profile

1934 births
2022 deaths
Spanish footballers
Footballers from Barcelona
Association football defenders
La Liga players
Segunda División players
Tercera División players
CD Condal players
FC Barcelona players
Gimnàstic de Tarragona footballers
Spain B international footballers
Spain international footballers
1962 FIFA World Cup players
Spanish football managers
CD Condal managers
FC Barcelona non-playing staff